The HK International Comedy Festival is an annual comedy festival in Hong Kong.

Founded by The TakeOut Comedy Club Hong Kong in 2007 for English and Chinese-speaking comedians resident in Hong Kong, the festival has expanded to include comedians from all over the world.  There are separate English and Chinese language competitions.  The festival also includes a night featuring improvisational comedy.

The 2016 festival will take place between October 13 and November 5.

Winners

References

External links
 Official website
 Official website of The TakeOut Comedy Club Hong Kong

Comedy festivals in China
Festivals in Hong Kong
Hong Kong comedy
Festivals established in 2007
2007 establishments in Hong Kong